Myrne is an urban-type settlement in Luhansk Raion (district) in Luhansk Oblast of eastern Ukraine. Population:

Demographics
Native language distribution as of the Ukrainian Census of 2001:
 Ukrainian: 7.43%
 Russian: 92.14%
 Others 0.43%

References

Urban-type settlements in Luhansk Raion